Cao Ziheng (Chinese: 曹紫珩; born 6 March 1995 in Dalian) is a Chinese football player who currently plays for Chinese Super League side Changchun Yatai.

Club career
Cao Ziheng joined Chinese Super League side Changchun Yatai's youth academy in 2006. He was promoted to the first team squad in 2014. He made his league debut for Changchun on 24 August 2014 in a 3–1 away defeat against Guangzhou R&F, coming on as a substitute for Eninho in the 79th minute.

Career statistics 
Statistics accurate as of match played 31 December 2020.

References

External links
 

1995 births
Living people
Chinese footballers
Footballers from Dalian
Changchun Yatai F.C. players
Chinese Super League players
China League One players
Association football midfielders
21st-century Chinese people